Rolls-Royce has used the Phantom name on full-sized luxury cars over the past century:
Rolls-Royce Phantom I, 1925–1931 
Rolls-Royce Phantom II, 1929–1935
Rolls-Royce Phantom III, 1936–1939 
Rolls-Royce Phantom IV, 1950–1956
Rolls-Royce Phantom V, 1959–1968
Rolls-Royce Phantom VI, 1968–1990
Rolls-Royce Phantom VII, 2003–2017
Rolls-Royce Phantom Drophead Coupé, 2007–2017
Rolls-Royce Phantom Coupé, 2008–2017
Rolls-Royce Phantom VIII, 2017–present